This is the following is a list of flags related with Trinidad and Tobago.

National flag

Government flags

Military flags

Historical flags

Spanish Rule

Dutch Rule

Polish–Lithuanian (Couronian) Rule

French Rule

Swedish Rule

British Rule

See also 

 Flag of Trinidad and Tobago
 Coat of arms of Trinidad and Tobago

References 

Flags of Trinidad and Tobago
Lists and galleries of flags
Flags